SF-6847 (aka Malonoben, Tyrphostin A9, GCP5126, and AG-17) is an uncoupling agent/protonophore. As of 1974 when it was discovered, it was considered most powerful, with a potency over 1800x that of 2,4-dinitrophenol - the prototypical uncoupling agent, and about 3x the effectiveness of 5-chloro-3-tert-butyl-2'-chloro-4'-nitrosalicylanilide.

References 

Uncoupling agents
Ionophores
Nitriles
Tert-butyl compounds
Phenols